The Saugeen Shores Police Service is a municipal police service in Ontario, Canada, providing service for Port Elgin, Southampton and Saugeen Township.

History

The Saugeen Shores Police Service was brought into existence with the amalgamation of the Port Elgin Police Service and Southampton Police Service in 1995 to form the Southampton-Port Elgin Police Service. The police service started to police the Saugeen Township under contract. When the three towns amalgamated, it became the service in which it is today.

Service profile

The Saugeen Shores Police Service consists of a chief of police, an inspector, 17 constables, 4 part-time constables, 6 auxiliary constables, and 3 full-time civilian support members.

External links
 Saugeen Shores Police Service

References

1995 establishments in Ontario
Provincial law enforcement agencies of Canada